Harden Furniture was a privately owned furniture manufacturer based in McConnellsville in Oneida County, New York.

History
Harden was founded in 1844 by Charles S. Harden. It was one of the oldest family-owned and operated furniture manufacturers in the United States. After 175 years of business, the company ceased operations in 2018.

References

Furniture companies of the United States
Manufacturing companies established in 1844
Manufacturing companies based in New York (state)
Companies based in Oneida County, New York
1844 establishments in New York (state)